The  was a Bo-2-Bo wheel arrangement AC electric locomotive type operated in Japan from 1968 until the 1990s. 14 locomotives were built by Hitachi between 1967 and 1980.

Operations

The locomotives often worked in multiple with Class EF71 locomotives.

History
A prototype locomotive, initially classified ED94 and numbered ED94 1, was delivered in 1967, with full-production locomotives delivered from 1968 until 1980. ED94 1 was modified and renumbered ED78 901 in 1968.
All 14 locomotives were built by Hitachi in Mito, Ibaraki, with modifications to convert ED94 1 to ED78 901 carried out at JNR's Koriyama factory.

Following the conversion of the Ou Main Line to standard gauge as part of the Yamagata Shinkansen in 1992, the Class ED78s were transferred to duties on the Tohoku Main Line and Senzan Line before ultimately being withdrawn.

Build history
The individual build dates of the fleet were as follows.

Preserved examples
, one member of the class is preserved: ED78 1. This locomotive was withdrawn in February 1987, and was subsequently stored at Fukushima Depot before being preserved at Fukushima Station. It was then moved to a site adjoining Rifu Station in Miyagi Prefecture, and later moved to the nearby Sendai General Shinkansen Depot. It was moved to Hitachi's Mito factory in Hitachinaka, Ibaraki in 2015 and cosmetically restored in 2016.

Classification

The ED78 classification for this locomotive type is explained below.
 E: Electric locomotive
 D: Four driving axles
 7x: AC locomotive with maximum speed exceeding

References

20 kV AC locomotives
Electric locomotives of Japan
B-2-B locomotives
1067 mm gauge locomotives of Japan
Railway locomotives introduced in 1968
Hitachi locomotives